The 28th Lumières Awards ceremony, presented by the Académie des Lumières, took place on 16 January 2023 to honour the best in French-speaking cinema of 2022. The nominations were announced on 15 December 2022. The Night of the 12th led the nominations with six.

Winners and nominees

The nominations were announced on 15 December 2022. Winners will be listed first, highlighted in boldface, and indicated with a double dagger.

Films with multiple nominations and awards

References

External links
 

Lumières
Lumières
2022 in Paris
Lumières Awards